RZUA (Reformed Zion Union Apostolic Churches of America) is a Methodist Christian denomination with a predominantly African-American membership that resides mostly in the South Hill and Tidewater area of Virginia.  It was founded in 1869 in Boydton, Virginia as the Zion Union Apostolic Church, and was reorganized as the Reformed Zion Union Apostolic Church in 1882. In 2023 it had 35 congregations.

References 

Christian denominations founded in the United States
Historically African-American Christian denominations
Pentecostal denominations in North America
Pentecostalism in Virginia
1869 establishments in Virginia
Holiness denominations
Religious organizations established in 1869
Methodist denominations in North America